Sarah J. McLaren is a New Zealand environmental scientist and professor at Massey University.

Academic career 
McLaren studied for her BSc (1986) at the University of Leeds and then moved to Canada to the University of Toronto for her MSc (1993). She returned to England and graduated from the University of Surrey with a PhD (1999) and joined their Centre for Environmental Strategy as a researcher.

In December 2005, McLaren moved to New Zealand where she worked for several years at Manaaki Whenua – Landcare Research. She joined the Institute of Agriculture and Environment at Massey University and as of 2021 is Director of the New Zealand Life Cycle Management Centre. She was promoted to full professor at Massey University effective from 1 January 2017.

Selected publications

References 

Living people
Year of birth missing (living people)
Alumni of the University of Leeds
University of Toronto alumni
Alumni of the University of Surrey
Academic staff of the Massey University
New Zealand women scientists
New Zealand women academics